Nieznaszyn  (1934–1945: Scheinau) is a village in the administrative district of Gmina Cisek, within Kędzierzyn-Koźle County, Opole Voivodeship, in south-western Poland.

The village has a population of 225.

Gallery

References

Nieznaszyn